"Weight of the World" is the second and final single taken from British R&B singer Lemar's fourth studio album, The Reason.

"Weight of the World" is co-produced by Jim Jonsin and Louis Biancaniello, while Lemar and Sam Watters co-wrote the lyrics. "Weight of the World" was released on 2 March 2009. It debuted at 108 on the UK Singles Chart. The song peaked at 31 in the UK and debuting at 10 in the R&B Chart.

Track listings
CD
 "Weight of the World"
 "Diamonds"

Promotion
Lemar performed the song on UK breakfast television show GMTV.

Charts
The song debuted at #108 in the UK before rising into the top 100 the following week at #46. "Weight of the World" had a final peak at #31.

References

2009 singles
Lemar songs
Song recordings produced by Jim Jonsin
Songs written by Sam Watters
Songs written by Louis Biancaniello
Songs written by Jim Jonsin
Songs written by Lemar
2008 songs
Epic Records singles